Vasilia is an Asian genus of crickets in the tribe Landrevini.

This genus appears to be monotypic, with the single species Vasilia vietnamensis (Gorochov, 1988).

References

Crickets